Homayoun Ardalan (Kurdish: ھۆمایون ئەردەڵان, Homayoun Ardalan; 2 February 1950 – 17 September 1992) was the official representative of the Kurdistan Democratic Party of Iran in Germany and a member of the Central Committee of this party. Ardalan was killed along with Sadegh Sharafkandi, Fattah Abdoli and Nouri Dehkordi during the 1992 Mykonos restaurant assassinations, Berlin.

Early life and career
Homayoun Ardalan was born on 2 February 1950, in Saqqez, Kurdistan Province, Iran. He was from the Ardalan family of Saqqez in Rojhalat and the son of Saifullah Khan Ardalan. With the beginning of the Revolution of 1978, he dropped out of Kurdistan University in Sanandaj and became a member of the Kurdistan Democratic Party of Iran. In 1983, he was elected a member of the Central Committee of the Democratic Party, after which he was transferred to the Saqqez Party Committee. After the Eighth Party Congress in 1987, he left for Germany to represent the Democratic Party in that country. He lived in Frankfurt.

Death

Ardalan was murdered in the Mykonos restaurant assassinations. On 17 September 1992. 
On the evening of September 17, at 10:47 p.m., two masked men burst into the back room of Mykonos restaurant and began shooting at the four Kurdish exiles around the table. Three of them died where they fell: Dr Sadegh Sharafkandi, the Secretary General of the Democratic Party of Iranian Kurdistan (PDKI), Fattah Abdoli and Homayoun Ardalan both PDKI Central Committee members. The fourth person was Nouri Dehkordi, a Kurdish political activist who was serving as a translator. Dehkordi was struck by seven bullets and later died in hospital.

In the Mykonos trial, the courts found Kazem Darabi, an Iranian national who worked as a grocer in Berlin, and Lebanese Abbas Rhayel, guilty of murder and sentenced them to life in prison. Two other Lebanese, Youssef Amin and Mohamed Atris, were convicted of being accessories to murder. In its 10 April 1997 ruling, the court issued an international arrest warrant for Iranian intelligence minister Hojjat al-Islam Ali Fallahian
 
after declaring that the assassination had been ordered by him with knowledge of supreme leader Grand Ayatollah Ali Khamenei and president Ayatollah Rafsanjani.

References

External links
Iran’s Killing Machine: Political Assassinations by the Islamic Regime
 Mousavian, an Iranian terrorist in Princeton
 Open Letter: Arash Sadeghi Sounds Alarm of Renewed Assassination Campaign, Human Rights Activists News Agency, 2018

1950 births
1992 deaths
Democratic Party of Iranian Kurdistan politicians
People from Saghez
People murdered in Berlin
Assassinated Iranian Kurdish politicians
Burials at Père Lachaise Cemetery
Iranian emigrants to Germany
Iranian exiles
Kurdish nationalists
1990s murders in Berlin
1992 murders in Germany